Jane Stafford is a New Zealand literature academic, and as of 2019 is a full professor at the Victoria University of Wellington.

Academic career
After a 1986 PhD titled  'An examination of the "De Passione" Section of John of Grimestone's Preaching Book'  at the Victoria University of Wellington, Stafford moved to staff, rising to full professor.

Stafford has published widely on the early literature of New Zealand and contemporary poetry.

Selected works 
 Stafford, Jane, and Mark Williams. Maoriland: New Zealand Literature, 1872-1914. Victoria University Press, 2006.
 Stafford, Jane. Colonial Literature and the Native Author: indigeneity and empire. Springer, 2016.
 Jackson, Anna, and Jane Stafford, eds. Floating Worlds: Essays on Contemporary New Zealand Fiction. Victoria University Press, 2009.

References

Living people
New Zealand women academics
Year of birth missing (living people)
Victoria University of Wellington alumni
Academic staff of the Victoria University of Wellington
English literature academics